The Jacob Miller House is a private house located at 307 Jackson Street in Petoskey, Michigan. It was placed on the National Register of Historic Places in 1986.

The Jacob Miller House is a two-story, cross-gabled frame Queen Anne structure with a single story addition in the rear. The front facade has a hip-roof, wrap-around porch supported by Doric columns. The house is sheathed with clapboard, with the gables covered with ornamental fish-scale shingles.

The Jacob Miller House was constructed in 1903, and is a well-preserved characteristic example of the Queen Anne style house constructed in Petoskey. It is associated with the carpenter Jacob Miller, who lived in the house for many years.

References

Houses on the National Register of Historic Places in Michigan
Queen Anne architecture in Michigan
Emmet County, Michigan